Jeon Bong-jun (1855 – 1895) was born in Taein, Jeollabuk-do, Korea. He was a prominent leader of the Donghak Peasant Revolution. Due to his short physical stature, he was called "Nokdu Janggun" (녹두장군, General mung bean).

Struggle and revolution 
In 1894 Jeon Bong Jun and other farmers pleaded with a Local magistrate of Jeolla Province to lift the heavy (and some say illegal) taxes and to return extorted property taken from people accused of unsubstantiated crimes. Jeon Bong Jun and the others were ultimately rejected. In reaction to this rejection he, along with other farmers, revolted and attacked the county office and threatened to punish corrupt officials if they did not cease all corruption.

End of revolution

On April 28, 1894, Jeon Bong Jun's revolution became anti-Western and anti-Japanese because of the oppressive and brutal actions of the Japanese army in punishing the Korean farmers.  This revolution spread from town to county as the peasant army vowed to eradicate the entirety of the Korean ruling class and expel all Japanese and western parties. By September his peasant revolt came to a violent end as his army of farmers were decisively defeated by a well trained, better equipped Japanese military in the Battle of Ugeumchi. He was arrested by the observer of the Jeonra province Yi Do-jae. Jeon Bong Jun was captured and was executed by hanging on 24 April 1895.

Cultural depictions
 Portrayed by Choi Moo-sung in the 2019 SBS TV series Nokdu Flower.
 There is a statue of Jeon Bong Jun in Seoul, at the intersection of Jong-ro and Ujeongguk-ro.

See also 
Cheondoism
Donghak Peasant Revolution
Son Byong-Hi

Notes

External links 
 전봉준 全琫準 at the Empas / EncyKorea
Gongju official visitor cite
The Independence Hall of Korea
clickkorea.org

Further reading
Lew, Young Ick. "The Conservative Character of the 1894 Tonghak Peasant Uprising: A Reappraisal with Emphasis on Chŏn Pong-jun's Background and Motivation." Journal of Korean Studies  7, no. 1 (1990): 149-80.

1854 births
1895 deaths
19th-century Korean poets
Donghak Peasant Revolution
Korean revolutionaries